Fire Prairie Creek is a stream in the U.S. state of Missouri.

Fire Prairie Creek was named for a prairie fire during pioneer days.

See also
List of rivers of Missouri

References

Rivers of Jackson County, Missouri
Rivers of Lafayette County, Missouri
Rivers of Missouri